Ayatollah Allama Hussain Bakhsh Jarra was a prominent Shia scholar from Punjab, Pakistan. He earned his degree of ijtihad from Hawza Elmiye Najaf, Iraq.

He wrote famous tafsir (exegesis) of Quran named by Anwar Najaf fi Asrar Najaf. It has 15 volumes. The 13 volumes (2 to 14) consist of exegesis of Quran from Surah Al-Fatiha to Surah Al-Nas and the First and Last volume i.e 15 are about special features of Quranic Compilation History , Benefit of Chapters, Verses and Various other Topics. Allama Hussain bakhsh Jara Born January '4' 1916 death1990

Prominent Students
 Grand Ayatollah Muhammad Hussain Najafi
 Allama Safdar Hussain Najafi
 Ayatollah Hafiz Riaz Hussain Naqvi Najafi
 Qazi Niaz Hussain Naqvi Najafi
 Qazi Fayyaz Hussain Naqvi6.Syed Fida Hussain Kazmi

Prominent Work
Tafsir Anwar Najaf fi Asrar Mushaf

See 

 Allama Yar Shah
 Grand Ayatollah Muhammad Hussain Najafi
 Alipur, Pakistan

References

Pakistani ayatollahs
Pakistani Shia Muslims